"Raisins and Almonds" is a traditional Jewish lullaby popularized in the arrangement by Abraham Goldfaden (1840-1908) for his 1880 Yiddish musical, "Shulamis". It has become so well known that it has assumed the status of a classic folk song. It has been recorded as both a vocal and instrumental by many artists over the years, including Itzhak Perlman, Chava Alberstein, Benita Valente, and Ella Jenkins.  It is a common lullaby among Ashkenazi European Jews (Ashkenazim).  This song has multiple translations and multiple versions, which have slight changes in both Yiddish and English lyrics.

Several ghetto writers used Goldfaden's lullaby as the basis for new songs: out of the Kovno Ghetto came  (In the yeshiva of Slobodka); in the Łódź Ghetto, Dovid Beygelman and Isaiah Shpigl wrote  (No raisins, no almonds). One verse of the song appears in the Herman Wouk novel War and Remembrance in Yiddish as well as an English translation, and also in the TV miniseries based on the book.

References

External links
 Lyrics and miscellaneous other materials related to the song
 Lyrics, written using the Yiddish alphabet.

Lullabies
Yiddish-language songs